Club DAOM, or simply DAOM (an acronym for "Dirección Autárquica de Obras Municipales"), is an Argentine sports club located in the Flores neighborhood of Buenos Aires. The club hosts a variety of sports and activities such as baseball, field hockey, roller skating, rugby union, tennis and volleyball.

The rugby union team currently plays in Primera C, the fourth division of the URBA league system. DAOM also has a women's rugby team competing in "Torneo Femenino" organised by the same body.

History
The club was founded in 1927 by workers and employees of the "Preservation Section and Tramway of Buenos Aires", a division area of the Municipality of Buenos Aires. The institution was primarily named as "Club Atlético Conservación y Tranvías". After being founded, the members of the club searched for a place where to settle. After visiting many places within the city of Buenos Aires, they finally chose a land located in the intersection of Varela and Castañares streets, at the South East of the city.

Once the land was acquired, the club members started to work in the construction of the facilities, being helped by the Municipality which collaborated with the project. The first step was to build a football field and its changing room, and other minor buildings. In 1936 the club changed its name to "Club Ente Autónomo de Industria Municipal", which lasted until 1943 when the acronym DAOM (which referred to "Dirección Autárquica de Obras Municipales") was approved as the definitive name of the institution.

From 1943 to date DAOM has built the swimming pool, the gym and fields for different sports. DAOM was also a pioneer of baseball in Argentina, being the first club to have a baseball-specific stadium in the country.

Baseball started to be practised at DAOM in 1947. Two years later the Argentine Baseball and Softball League was created and soon organized a first division championship. Some of the institutions invited to the tournament were Gimnasia y Esgrima and DAOM. A second division (formed by the same teams taking part at primera) was also created to increase the level of the tournaments.

DAOM won its first title in 1951, the second disputed by the team. The institution has won a large number of championships since then, becoming one of the most successful baseball clubs of Argentina.

References

External links
 

d
d
D
d
d
d
d
d
d